BmTx3 is a neurotoxin, which is a component of the venom of the scorpion Buthus Martensi Karsch. It blocks A-type potassium channels in the central nervous system and hERG-channels in the heart.

Source/Isolation
BmTx3 was originally purified from the venom of the Chinese scorpion, Buthus Martensi Karsch.
BmTx3 is a “short-chain” peptide like other potassium channel blockers in the scorpion venom and added to the phylogenetic tree in the subfamily α-KTx15. Its 3D structure has not yet been elucidated, but based on sequence similarity it likely resembles the 3D structure of BmTx1  or Discrepin.

Biochemistry
BmTx3 consists of an α-helix and two β-sheet segments cross-linked by three disulfide bridges (Cs-α/β motif). It is a short chain peptide with a molecular mass of 3751.6 Da; it consists of 37 amino acids.

Target
BmTx3 is the first toxin from the scorpion α-KTx subfamily 15  with two functional faces. As all α-KTx peptides, BmTx3 blocks A-type (IA) potassium currents (KD = 54 nM). BmTx3 blocks primarily the Kv4.x proteins and has a higher affinity for Kv4.1 channels than for Kv4.2 and Kv4.3 channels. The second functional face of BmTx3 blocks the hERG (human Ether-à-go-go) channel (KD = 2 μM), a characteristic belonging to γ-KTx peptides.
BmTx3 binding site seems essentially localized in neurons but could also be present in glial cells, endothelial cells and/or arterial smooth muscle cells. The distribution of BmTx3 binding sites is heterogeneous; a high density is found in the caudate–putamen and accumbens nucleus, thalamus, hippocampal formation and cerebellum.

Mode of Action
The functional face of “short-chain” scorpion toxins is built of two important dyads (Lys and Tyr) on the β-sheet side. Lysine plugs deep into the channel pore and Tyrosine, as penultimate or ultimate and hydrophobic residue, turns it to fixate it, leading to a physical occlusion of the channel pore. This is supported by the finding that deletion of the two C-terminal residues (sBmTx3-delYP) results in loss of ability to block IA-current.

The other functional face is thought to be situated at the α-helix-side and composed of Arg18 and Lys19, like the functional face of other hERG toxins. It is known that α-KTx peptides use the β-sheet side to interact with the receptor, whereas γ-KTx peptides usually use their α-helix-side. As BmTx3 seems to use both sides to bind to different potassium channels, it might be an evolutionary transient between the two families.

Toxicity
When injected into mice it causes epileptiform behavior. This might be due to its effect on A-type K+ channels, which, like the Kv4.x, are involved in action potential back propagation, firing frequency, spike initiation and action potential waveform determination.
Blocking of the hERG channel can cause drug-induced long QT syndrome, arrhythmias and ventricular fibrillation which can result in death.

References

Neurotoxins
Ion channel toxins